La Novela is the fifth studio album by Akwid, released in March 2008. Special guests include Voces del Rancho, Fidel Rueda, Raul Hernandez, Los Tucanes de Tijuana, Rocio Saldoval "La Peligrosa", El Flaco Elizalde, Palomo, Jenni Rivera, Kuky, and Chino XL. It received a nomination for Best Latin Urban Album at the Grammy Awards of 2009.

Track listing

Charts

Weekly charts

Year-end charts

Sales and certifications

References

2008 albums
Akwid albums